Herbert Ettengruber  (born 19 July 1941) is a German politician, representative of the Christian Social Union of Bavaria. Between 1996 and 2008 he was a member of the Landtag of Bavaria.

See also
List of Bavarian Christian Social Union politicians

References

External links
Official site

Christian Social Union in Bavaria politicians
1941 births
Living people
Place of birth missing (living people)